Astra Imperio is a tram produced by the Romanian company Astra Vagoane Călători in Arad. It is a 100% low-floor, designed in partnership with Siemens. Imperio's design is based on the Avenio platform using electronic and traction equipment supplied by Siemens Mobility.

The first deliveries started in October 2014 for the Arad local transport company.

Technical specifications

Product list

References

External links

 Data at the manufacturer's website

Tram vehicles of Romania
Astra trams